Richard Burges may refer to:
Richard Rundle Burges (1754–1797), British Royal Navy officer
Richard Goldsmith Burges (1847–1905), Australian politician
Richard Fenner Burges (1873–1945), American attorney, legislator and conservationist from Texas

See also
Richard Burgess (disambiguation)